"She" is the fifth and final single from the album 7 Years and 50 Days by German trance group Groove Coverage. The song is a contrafactum of the German Christmas carol Stern über Bethlehem (English Star above Bethlehem).

Remix list

"She" (Radio Edit) – 3:50	
"She" (Extended Version) – 5:31	
"She" (Droggn-Abroggn Remix) – 3:18	
"She" – 2:23	
"She" (Skam Remix) – 5:55	
"She" (Canadian Remix) – 3:30

Chart positions

References

Groove Coverage songs
2004 songs
Songs written by Lou Bega